Robert Habros is a special effects artist who was nominated at the 82nd Academy Awards for his work on the film District 9. His nomination was shared with Matt Aitken, Dan Kaufman and Peter Muyzers.

He also worked on TV shows such as Stargate SG-1 and Fringe.

Selected filmography

 SpaceCamp (1986)
 Bill & Ted's Excellent Adventure (1989)
 A Gnome Named Gnorm (1990)
 Spaced Invaders (1990)
 Suburban Commando (1991)
 Honey, I Blew Up the Kid (1992)
 Teenage Mutant Ninja Turtles III (1993)
 District 9 (2009)
 Chronicle (2012)

References

External links

Living people
Year of birth missing (living people)
Special effects people